Dominik Hrbatý and David Škoch defeated 6–2, 6–4 James Auckland and Peter Luczak in the final. They became the first champions of this tournament.

Seeds

Draw

Draw

References
 Doubles Draw

Zagorka Cup